State Trunk Highway 92 (often called Highway 92, STH-92 or WIS 92) is a  state highway in Green and Dane counties in the south-central area of the US state of Wisconsin that runs north–south from Mount Horeb to near Brooklyn.

Route descriuption

Major intersections

See also

References

External links

092
Transportation in Green County, Wisconsin
Transportation in Dane County, Wisconsin